Sar Rig-e Dum (also Romanized as Sar Rīg-e Dūm; also known as Sar Rīg-e Do and Sarrīk-e Karbalā’ī Fāţemeh) is a village in Isin Rural District, in the Central District of Bandar Abbas County, Hormozgan Province, Iran. At the 2006 census, its population was 296, in 61 families.

References 

Populated places in Bandar Abbas County